Guan Ping (born 1 February 1966) is a Chinese female former racewalking athlete who competed in the 10 kilometres race walk. She was the gold medallist at the 1986 Asian Games, becoming the first female racewalk champion at that competition and starting China's unbeaten dominance of the Asian Games women's racewalk which extends to today.

Guan competed at the 1987 World Championships in Athletics, but failed to finish the distance after being disqualified. She represented China three times at the IAAF World Race Walking Cup, with her best result being a silver medal in 1985, which helped China to the team title alongside the winner Yan Hong. She was also a silver medallist at the 1986 Goodwill Games, finishing after Australia's Kerry Saxby.

Her personal best of 42:50.0 minutes for the 10,000 m track walk was set in 1992. Her highest global ranking was second in 1985, courtesy of her World Race Walking Cup performance. She was also third on the seasonal rankings in 1986, only behind Soviets Yelena Kuznetsova and Irina Strakhova.

International competitions

References

External links

Living people
1966 births
Chinese female racewalkers
Asian Games gold medalists for China
Asian Games medalists in athletics (track and field)
Athletes (track and field) at the 1986 Asian Games
World Athletics Championships athletes for China
Medalists at the 1986 Asian Games
Goodwill Games medalists in athletics
Competitors at the 1986 Goodwill Games